The New Sudan Vision is one of the prominent few online South Sudanese newspapers. Founded in January 2006 in Winnipeg by South Sudanese students with the mission to "bridge the information gap," New Sudan Vision still has a way to go in consolidating the dawn of peace in Sudan with the signing of the Comprehensive Peace Agreement (CPA) which ended Africa's longest civil war. 

Based in Canada, though with members and contributions from Sudanese at home and abroad, the website has drawn praise for its professional reporting of news and its fair approach to issues of national importance. 

In its editorials, the New Sudan Vision upholds its core principle that Sudan must be a country that respects and treats all its people equally, regardless of race or differences in religion. The NSV does not seek to campaign for separation or unity of Sudan; it wants to educate the citizens by bringing them information and analyses to enlighten them make informed decision in 2011 when South votes to secede or joins the united Sudan.   

The New Sudan Vision provides news of "Current Sudan (especially Southern Sudan) news and news of the Sudanese diaspora."

References

External links
The New Sudan Vision

Newspapers published in Sudan